Doggy Day School (Escuela para perros in Latin America, or Escola Pra Cachorro on Brazil) is an animated children's television series created by Cathy Moss, who also created Franny's Feet.

It debuted on Nickelodeon in Brazil on 12 October 2009.

Premise
Doggy Day School revolves around five dogs, Lucas, Lili, Koda, Suki, and Pedro, who go to a day school owned by Rosie every morning. The group of puppies learn about each other and the world they live in, all while having various adventures together.

Characters

Main
 Lucas (voiced by Sonja Ball) is a dalmatian dog, and the mascot of the group. He is easily excitable and curious, even in the most serious situations.
 Lili (voiced by Angela Galuppo) is a charming and delicate miniature poodle. Sometimes she gets bossy, and she loves to gossip. She is also full of fun ideas.
 Koda (voiced by Mark Hauser) is a Siberian Husky who loves adventure. He has a big imagination and a desire to become a superhero.
 Suki (voiced by Sonja Ball) is a Newfoundland dog. She is very docile and sensitive, as she is always willing to help the other puppies.
 Pedro (voiced by Mark Hauser) is a Basset Hound. He is the intelligent street dog of the group, and he loves to eat biscuits.
 Rosie (voiced by Kaniehtiio Horn) is the owner of the day school who looks after the pets.

Recurring
Lois is a cat and a bad neighbor to the dogs, she lives in the pet store next door.
 Vlad (voiced by Mark Hauser) is a stunt dog movie star who frequently visits the daycare and demonstrates his tricks for the group.
 Daisy is an Afghan. She appears in the episode "Food for Thought".

Episodes
Series premiered in Brazil on 12 October 2009.

Season 1 (2009)

Season 2 (2010-2011)

Broadcast
Doggy Day School debuted on Nickelodeon in Brazil on 12 October 2009, however the series was dubbed in Brazilian Portuguese. The series aired in its original English-language version on TVOKids, Knowledge Kids and the Aboriginal Peoples Television Network in Canada from 2010 to 2019.

References

External links
  on Mixer Films

2000s Brazilian animated television series
2010s Brazilian animated television series
2009 Brazilian television series debuts
2011 Brazilian television series endings
2000s Canadian animated television series
2010s Canadian animated television series
2010 Canadian television series debuts
2011 Canadian television series endings
Brazilian children's animated television series
Canadian children's animated adventure television series
English-language television shows
TVO original programming
Animated television series about dogs